Chonala masoni, the Chumbi wall, is a species of satyrine butterfly found in Bhutan, China and north-eastern India.

The species is named the Chumbi wall after the Chumbi Valley where it was "presumed" to have been collected by a native collector and passed on to Henry John Elwes in 1881 when he visited Sikkim with Frederick DuCane Godman. It was originally described as a species in the genus Debis.

References

Satyrini
Butterflies described in 1883
Butterflies of Asia